The men's competition in the super-heavyweight (+105 kg) division was held on 25 and 26 September 2010.

Schedule

Medalists

Records

Results

References
Pages 37–38 

- Mens +105 kg, 2010 World Weightlifting Championships